The Butterfly Lovers is a Chinese legend centered around the tragic romance between Liang Shanbo and Zhu Yingtai, whose names form the Chinese title of the story. The title is often abbreviated as Liang Zhu.

The story was selected as one of China's Four Great Folktales by the "Folklore Movement" in the 1920s—the others being the Legend of the White Snake (Baishezhuan), Lady Meng Jiang, and The Cowherd and the Weaving Maid (Niulang Zhinü).

Six cities in China have collaborated in 2004 on a formal application for the Proclamation of Masterpieces of the Oral and Intangible Heritage of Humanity on the legend at UNESCO, submitted in 2006 through the Chinese Ministry of Culture.

Legend
The legend of Liang Shanbo and Zhu Yingtai is set in the Eastern Jin dynasty (266–420 AD).

Zhu Yingtai is the ninth child and only daughter of the wealthy Zhu family of Shangyu, Zhejiang. Although women are traditionally discouraged from taking up scholarly pursuits, Zhu manages to convince her father to allow her to attend classes in disguise as a man. During her journey to Hangzhou, she meets Liang Shanbo, a scholar from Kuaiji (present-day Shaoxing). They chat and feel a strong affinity for each other at their first meeting. Hence, they gather some soil as incense and take an oath of fraternity in the pavilion of a wooden bridge.

They study together for the next three years in school and Zhu gradually falls in love with Liang. Although Liang equals Zhu in their studies, he is still a bookworm and fails to notice the feminine characteristics exhibited by his classmate.

One day, Zhu receives a letter from her father, asking her to return home as soon as possible. Zhu has no choice but to pack her belongings immediately and bid Liang farewell. However, in her heart, she has already confessed her love for Liang and is determined to be with him for all eternity. Before her departure, she reveals her true identity to the headmaster's wife and asks her to pass a jade pendant to Liang as a betrothal gift.

Liang accompanies his "sworn brother" for 18 miles to see her off. During the journey, Zhu hints to Liang that she is actually a woman. For example, she compares them to a pair of mandarin ducks (a symbol of lovers in Chinese culture), but Liang does not catch her hints and does not even have the slightest suspicion that his companion is a woman in disguise. Zhu finally comes up with an idea and tells Liang that she will act as a matchmaker for him and Zhu's "sister". Before they part, Zhu reminds Liang to visit her residence later so he can propose to marry her "sister". Liang and Zhu reluctantly part ways at the Changting pavilion.

Months later, when Liang visits Zhu, he discovers that she is actually a woman. They are devoted to and passionate about each other and they make a vow to the effect of "till death do us part". The joy of their reunion is short-lived as Zhu's parents have already arranged for her to marry a wealthy merchant, Ma Wencai. Liang is heartbroken when he hears the news and his health gradually deteriorates until he becomes critically ill. He dies in office later as a county magistrate.

On the day of Zhu's marriage to Ma, strong winds prevent the wedding procession from escorting the bride beyond Liang's grave, which lies along the journey. Zhu leaves the procession to pay her respects at Liang's grave. She descends in bitter despair and begs for the grave to open up. Suddenly, the grave opens with a clap of thunder. Without further hesitation, Zhu throws herself into the grave to join Liang. Their spirits emerge in the form of a pair of butterflies and fly away together, never to be separated again.

Historical accounts
The earliest record of the legend can be traced back to the late Tang Dynasty. In Shidao Sifan Zhi, the author Liang Zaiyan wrote:
The righteous woman Zhu Yingtai was buried together with Liang Shanbo.

In Xuan Shizhi, the author Zhang Du wrote:
Yingtai, a daughter of the Zhu family of Shangyu, disguised herself as a man and attended school together with Liang Shanbo from Kuaiji. Shanbo's courtesy name was "Churen". Zhu returned home first. Two years later, Shanbo visited her and only knew that she was a woman then. He was disappointed and felt as though he had made a loss. He asked her parents for her hand in marriage but her family had already betrothed her to the Ma family. Shanbo assumed office as a magistrate in Yin (in present-day western Ningbo) and died of illness later and was buried west of the city of Mao (in eastern Ningbo). Zhu was on her journey to the Ma residence by boat and passed by Liang's grave. The strong wind and waves prevent the boat from advancing. After learning that it was Shanbo's grave, she set foot on land and broke down. The ground suddenly cracked open and Zhu was buried within. Jin Dynasty chancellor Xie An proclaimed the grave as the "Tomb of the Righteous Woman".

The legend was also recorded in various official records such as Yinxian Zhi, Ningbofu Zhi and Yixing Jingxi Xinzhi.

Liang-Zhu Cultural Park
Adjacent to the Yuyao River with a land area of 300 mu, the Liang-Zhu Cultural Park features multiple sceneries including "Becoming Sworn Brothers at Thatched Bridge", "Being Classmates for Three Years", "18 Miles of Send-off", "Farewell in the Tower" and "Reunion of Butterfly Lovers" according to the main line of the story Liang Shanbo and Zhu Yingtai. The layout of ancient Chinese architectural style in the lower reaches of the Yangtze River such as kiosks, pavilions, platforms and towers was adopted against the mountains and waters, realizing a gorgeous effect of diverse landscapes of mountain beyond mountain and garden beyond garden.

Liang Shanbo Temple
Located in Shaojiadu Village, Gaoqiao Town five miles west to Ningbo City, the Liang Shanbo Temple is built with a sitting statue of the couple, with Zhu Yingtai dressed in phoenix coronet and embroidered cape sitting on the right side of Liang Shanbo. The rear hall is their bedroom set with a vermilion wooden bed, behind which is the couple's tomb. People in Ningbo City tend to worship the temple for bliss of eternal love of couples.
The Liang Shanbo Temple built in 347 by the locals in memory of Liang Shanbo, who had contributed greatly during his term in office as a magistrate to resolving the problems caused by the flooding of the river. The Liang-Zhu Cultural Park in Ningbo was built by the locals, with the love story as its main theme. The "Liang-Zhu Tomb", "Liang Shanbo Temple", "Husband and Wife Bridge", and Qin Gong are officially recognized by the Chinese Liang-Zhu Culture Association as culturally significant sites for the birth of the legend.

Sino-Italian love culture festival held in Verona
The Sino-Italian love culture festival was held on Wednesday, 24 September 2008 in the northern Italian city of Verona, co-sponsored by the municipal governments of Verona and Ningbo city.
Verona is the literary hometown of Romeo and Juliet, the lead characters in Shakespeare's famous play Romeo and Juliet.
Ningbo is the setting for the Chinese classical romantic tragedy Butterfly Lovers, or Liang Zhu. The Butterfly Lovers is also known as the Chinese Romeo and Juliet.
A white marble statue portraying Liang Shanbo and Zhu Yingtai, the two lovers who eventually turned into butterflies, was placed in the square in front of the Juliet Museum in central Verona during the festival.
Fifteen couples from Ningbo in Chinese-style costumes held a romantic wedding in Verona, with blessings from the locals.
Ningbo and Verona became sister cities in October 2005. A delegation from Verona visited Ningbo in 2007 and presented the city with a bronze statue of Juliet.

Artistic interpretations

Stage plays and operas
The legend has been adapted into traditional Chinese opera in several local varieties, as Liang Zhu in Yue opera and In the Shade of the Willow in Sichuan opera. The Yue opera version was made into a colour motion picture in the 1950s in China. Filming by the Ministry of Culture and the East China Military and Political Commission took place in Zhu's legendary hometown of Shangyu.

Based on the romance, the Shaw Brothers Studio also produced The Love Eterne, a film in Huangmei opera directed by Li Han-hsiang in 1962, starring Ivy Ling Po and Betty Loh Ti.

In May 2001, a group of students from the University of Oxford formed the Liang Zhu Drama Production Company, and rewrote the story into a contemporary drama that was performed in English.

In September 2005, Denise Ho performed in the musical Butterfly Lovers as the leading actress, producer and musical director. Her album of the same name gave her three Number 1 singles – "Becoming a Butterfly", "Lawrence and Lewis" and "Coffee in a Soda Bottle", which are all based on the story of the Butterfly Lovers, with possible homosexual themes. These singles helped her to receive the "Female Singer Silver Award" at the Ultimate Song Chart Awards Presentation 2005.

In September 2013, Australian musical theatre company Chinese Music Group performed its annual musical The Butterfly Lover at the Union Theatre at the University of Melbourne. The play, written by Australian journalist and writer Bang Xiao, reformed the storyline with contemporary views, and was delivered in Chinese mandarin with live subtitles in English and Chinese.

The story has been adapted into Vietnamese Cai Luong a number of times, with its Sino-Vietnamese title "Lương Sơn Bá-Chúc Anh Đài. The leading roles have been played by Vietnamese actors and actresses such as Hương Lan, Phi Nhung, Tái Linh, Phượng Mai, Mạnh Quỳnh and Vũ Linh. The Vietnamese adaptation extends the roles of the servants of Liang Shanbo and Zhu Yingtai as well as Ma Wencai who becomes a cruel and manipulating villain. In this adaptation, Ma Wencai attends the same school as Liang Shanbo and Zhu Yingtai, and exposes Zhu Yingtai's true identity to some of her classmates.  After Zhu Yingtai and Liang Shanbo separate, Ma Wencai and his family destroy his former school due to the fact that a female had been enrolled there. He indirectly kills his former teacher and also plays a part in Liang Shanbo's death. There are some other changes throughout the adaptation but the overall plot remains intact.

In September 2016, Nation Broadcasting Corporation together with the Musicals Society of Bangkok staged Butterfly Lovers the Musical, featuring Kanyapas Srinarong-Chayanuwat as Zhu Yingtai and Nat Thewphaingam as Liang Shanbo. Music, Lyrics and Script by Suruj Tipakora-Seni, Directed by Victor Kriengsak Silakong and Choreographed by Manaschai Bunchung.

In 2017 English Choreographer Paul James Rooney created and choreographed a ballet version of Butterfly Lovers for Tivoli Ballet Theater, Copenhagen, using the music of the Butterfly Lovers' Violin Concerto.

In 2022, a musical of the same name, loosely based on the legend was staged in Hong Kong's Shouson Theatre, directed and written by Marc Ngan and Amos Wong.

In 2023, Jessie Chung and Paul Lee starred in a stage play adaptation of Butterfly Lovers. The production was brought into being by Malaysia's Symphony Theatre, who gathered an international team of 35 talents from Taiwan, US, Australia and Malaysia to take on the colossal performance.

Film and television

Film
 The Love Eterne is a 1963 Taiwan musical film of the Huangmei opera genre, directed by Li Han-hsiang, and produced by Shaw Brothers. The artistic and commercial success of this feature was in part due to the casting of Ivy Ling Po, who was a relatively unknown supporting actress before this feature, as the male protagonist by the director Li Han-Hsiang.
 The Lovers is a 1994 Hong Kong film directed by Tsui Hark, starring Charlie Yeung and Nicky Wu.
 The Butterfly Lovers is a 2008 Hong Kong film based on the legend, but in a wuxia setting, directed by Jingle Ma and starring Wu Chun and Charlene Choi.
 The Butterfly Lovers: Leon and Jo is an animated film directed by Tsai Min-chin, voice-played by Elva Hsiao, Rene Liu and Jacky Wu.

Television
 Qishi Fuqi – Liang Shanbo Yu Zhu Yingtai is a 1999 Taiwanese television series produced by Formosa Television in Hokkien, starring Zhao Jing and Alyssa Chia.
 Xin Liang Shanbo Yu Zhu Yingtai is a 2000 Taiwanese television series released by CTV, starring Show Lo and Noel Leung.
 Butterfly Lovers is a 2007 Chinese television series starring Peter Ho and Dong Jie.
 Journey to the West (1996) features the tale where Liang Shanbo (played by Wayne Lai) was just one of the many heaven-mandated reincarnations of Marshal Tianpeng who later became Zhu Bajie.

Music
The story also inspired the production of Butterfly Lovers' Violin Concerto, or Liang Zhu Violin Concerto as known in Chinese, a work for violin and orchestra. It was composed by He Zhanhao and Chen Gang in 1958. The piece has been the most musically symbolic retelling of the legend; at 25 minutes and 40 seconds long, it has now become a classic piece of Chinese music. During the 1970s, Hong Kong television station TVB adapted the legend as a musical miniseries, with Roman Tam and Susanna Kwan supplying the vocals for the soundtrack composed by Joseph Koo. The musical piece was used as the theme music for more than two films.

 Butterfly (2004) is the 15th track in the Shining Energy album by Twelve Girls Band
 Denise Ho (2005) performed in the musical Butterfly Lovers as the leading actress, producer and musical director. Her album of the same name gave her three Number 1 singles – "Becoming a Butterfly", "Lawrence and Lewis" and "Coffee in a Soda Bottle", which are all based on the story of the Butterfly Lovers, with possible homosexual themes. These singles helped her to receive the "Female Singer Silver Award" at the Ultimate Song Chart Awards Presentation 2005 (叱吒樂壇流行榜頒獎典禮).
 Liang Shanbo Yu Zhuliye (Liang Shanbo and Juliet) (2006) is a duet performed by Gary Cao and Genie Chuo. It was listed as the 1st track in the Xi Guan album by Genie Chuo.
 Shuang Fei is a song associated with the story. It was used as one of the theme songs for The Lovers (1994) and the ending theme song for Butterfly Lovers (2007). It was performed by Nicky Wu in 1994 and Peter Ho in 2007.
 In May 2018, on her first full studio album in nine years, called Butterflies, Basia released "Liang and Zhu." The song was noted as “a deeply felt, simply gorgeous ballad, which refers to the Chinese folk-legend of the two lovers named in the title.

Notes

References and further reading
 Chen, Rachel (2010). "Four Chinese Legends". A recent narration along with three other legends. 
 "'Butterfly Lovers' to bid for Intangible World Heritage" (15 June 2004) Xinhuanet.
 "China to seek world heritage listing of 'butterfly lovers' story" (14 June 2004) Newsgd.com (member of Nanfang Daily Group).

External links
 A cross art exhibition based on the Butterfly Lovers' by Royal College of Music and Royal College of Art students 
 Short biography of Zhang Du, author of Records of the Xuan Hall (in Chinese)
 Information of the present locations of Yin and Mao (in Chinese)
 The Butterfly Lovers – A Chinese play in English performed by Oxford University students
 Liang Zhu Violin Concerto

Chinese legends
Fictional duos
Love stories
Jin dynasty (266–420)